Murgiya is a town in Sainamaina Municipality 3 & 4, Rupandehi District, Nepal. People of different castes, cultures and religions live here. Being one of the most developed area on Sainamaina Municipalities, there are a variety of shops which makes it as a Main Market of Sainamaina as well.Here is well developed market for various things like Hardware,vet supplies and clothing.

Religious Places
Murgiya is also popular as a religious site, its temples include:
Parroha Mandir
Nawa Durga Bhawani Mandir
RAni Kuwa

Education
Schools and colleges include:
Galaxy English Boarding High School
Sunghava Public Higher Secondary School
Prabhat English Boarding  Secondary School
New Academy Boarding School  
Parroha Uccha Madhayamik Bhidyalaya

Sports
Football is the most popular game played in the town, along with cricket, taekwondo, badminton, and volleyball. All the responsible people are working to make the play ground as local level Sainamaina Rangasala.

Populated places in Rupandehi District